Jaclyn Sienna India is an American entrepreneur and travel adviser. She is the founder and CEO of Sienna Charles, a lifestyle and travel concierge agency.

Career 
India began her career at Le Bec-Fin, a French restaurant in Philadelphia. It was where she first observed services at the highest level. When India and her husband moved to Florida, she started working at a traditional travel agency. In 2008, India founded Sienna Charles with her husband Freddy Charles Reinert. According to CNN, Sienna Charles planned a trip for a world leader for the first time, in 2012. She choreographed a trip to Ethiopia's Omo valley for former president George W. Bush, in 2015. Since 2012, Her agency has planned more than 100 trips for at least 15 presidents, prime ministers, public figures and also celebrities, such as Mariah Carey.

References 

Living people
American women company founders
21st-century American businesspeople
21st-century American businesswomen
Year of birth missing (living people)